Muğla is a city in southwestern Turkey. The city is the center of the District of Menteşe and Muğla Province, which stretches along Turkey's Aegean coast. Muğla (Menteşe) district area neighbors the district areas of Milas, Yatağan and Kavaklıdere to its north by north-west and those of Ula and Köyceğiz, all of whom are dependent districts. Muğla is the administrative capital of a province that incorporates internationally well-known and popular tourist resorts such as Bodrum, Marmaris, Datça, Dalyan, Fethiye, Ölüdeniz and also the smaller resort of Sarigerme.

History

Classical antiquity
In ancient times, Muğla was apparently a minor settlement: A halfway-point along the passage between the Carian cities of Idrias (later Stratonicea) to the north and Idyma (modern Akyaka) to the southwest on the coast. The indigenous name Mobolla, over time corrupted into "Mogolla" and then further into the modern "Muğla", appears for the first time in the beginning of the 2nd century BCE at the time of its region's passage from what was apparently an eastern Carian federation linked with Taba (modern Tavas) and other cities to Rhodian domination. Mobolla was part of the Rhodian Peraea on a firm basis as of 167 BCE until at least the 2nd century CE. The Rhodian territory started here and while region was subject to Rhodes, it was not incorporated in the Rhodian state.

There are almost no ruins to reveal the history of the settlement of Mobolla. On the high hill to the north of the city, a few ancient remains indicate that it was the site of an acropolis. A handful of inscriptions were unearthed within the city itself and they date back to the 2nd century BC.

In 2018, archaeologists unearthed a 2,300 year-old rock sepulchre of an ancient Greek boxer named Diagoras of Rhodes, on a hill in the Turgut village, Muğla province, Marmaris. This unusual pyramid tomb was considered to belong to a holy person by the local people. The shrine, used as a pilgrimage by locals until the 1970s, also has the potential to be the only pyramid grave in Turkey. Excavation team also discovered an inscription with these words: “I will be vigilant at the very top so as to ensure that no coward can come and destroy this grave.”

In 2018, archaeological ruins and mosaics discovered in the city have been confirmed to belong to the villa of the Greek fisherman Phainos, who lived in the 2nd century CE. Phainos was the richest and the most famous fisherman of his time.

Turkish conquest
Turkish-era Muğla also remained a minor site in the beginning despite having been captured relatively early for western Anatolia in the course of the 13th century. The local ruling dynasty of Menteşe had their capital in Milas.

Ottoman and Republican periods
Muğla acquired regional importance after it replaced Milas as the seat of the subprovince (sanjak) under the Ottoman Empire in 1420. The sanjak kept the name Menteşe until the Republican Era, when it was renamed Muğla after its seat of government. From 1867 until 1922, Muğla was part of Aidin Vilayet.

Geography
The district area's physical features are determined by several pot-shaped high plains, delimited by mountains, of which the largest is the one where the city of Muğla is located and which is called under the same name (Muğla Plain). It is surrounded by steep slopes denuded of soil, paved with calcerous geology, and a scrub cover which gives the immediate vicinity of Muğla a barren appearance uncharacteristic of its region. Arable land is limited to valley floors.

Economy
Its former profile as a predominantly rural, difficult to access, isolated and underpopulated region enclosed by a rugged mountainous complex is now coming to an end. Also in recent years, a major program of restoration of the city's architectural heritage has enhanced local tourism. The city remains an orderly, compact, and provincial agricultural center. The city which retains its old neighborhoods, not having succumbed to the mid-20th century boom in concrete reconstruction, but displays a progressive mind as exemplified by the pride still expressed at having had Turkey's first female provincial governor in the 1990s, Lale Aytaman. Nevertheless, Muğla still lacks sizeable manufacturing and processing centers, and its economy relies on trade, crafts, services, tourism, and agriculture. Therefore, tourism in Muğla is a great opportunity for local community employment, and its fertile soil and amenable climate provide a variety of products for people working in the agricultural sector.

Climate
Muğla has a rather humid Mediterranean climate (Köppen: Csa, Trewartha: 'wet' Cs or Cf). It is characterised by long, hot, dry summers and cool, wet winters.

Places of interest 
Although it is close to major resorts, Muğla has only recently begun to attract visitors. Sights of interest in the city include:

 Great Mosque of Muğla (Ulu Cami) – large mosque built in 1344 by the Beys of Menteşe
 Konakaltı Han and Yağcılar Han – restored 18th century caravanserais, the first used as an art gallery and facing Muğla Museum, and the second used for more commercial purposes
 Kurşunlu Cami  – large mosque built in 1495
 Muğla City Museum has a good collection of archaeological and ethnographical artefacts, and 9 million year-old animal and plant fossils, recently discovered in nearby Kaklıcatepe
 the Ottoman Empire-era bazaar (Arasta) – marked by a clock tower built by a Greek craftsman named Filivari Usta in 1895
 Vakıflar Hamam –  a still operating Turkish bath which dates back to 1258

The old quarter of Muğla – on the slopes and around Saburhane Square (Meydanı), consisting of about four hundred registered old houses dating from the 18th and 19th centuries, many of which are restored. These houses are mainly in the Turkish / Ottoman style, characterized by hayat ("courtyard") sections accessed through double-shuttered doors called kuzulu kapı ("lamb doors") and dotted with chimneys typical of Muğla. But there are also a number of "Greek" houses. The differences between the two types of houses may have as much to do with the extent to which wood or stone were used in their architecture, and whether they were arranged in introverted or extraverted styles, as with who inhabited them previously.

Local students tend to hang out in open air cafés along the İzmir highway, or in the caravanserai, or in Sanat Evi ("Art House") – an Ottoman-style residence that has been turned into a café / art gallery exhibiting principally wood carvings.

Politics 

Muğla's political color has traditionally been center-left. In Turkey's 2004 local elections, Dr. Osman Gürün (CHP) was re-elected, increasing his votes to 43.28%, aided in this by the abrupt virtual collapse of the other center-left party the DSP. The 2004 elections were the seventh successive victory for the center-left candidates in the Muğla municipality. Turkey's incumbent AKP and the traditional center-right DYP have each obtained (24.5–24.75%). In 2009 communal elections, MHP made a significant leap in votes and reached 24.2% of votes cast. CHP had collected almost half of the votes at 46%.

Sports 
The local football club, Muğlaspor currently compete in the third tier of the Turkish football pyramid.

Notable people from Muğla 

 Şahidi İbrahim Dede – 15th–16th century Sufi poet
 Basil Zaharoff (Βασίλειος Ζαχάρωφ) -  Muğla, 1849 - Monte Carlo, 1936, Greek arms dealer and industrialist  
 Nail Çakırhan – 20th century poet and architect
 Zihni Derin – 20th century agronomist and agriculturalist who pioneered tea production in Turkey

Due to the particularity of its location, commanding a large part of Anatolia's southwestern coast and a number of busy district centers, Muğla is also notable by the large number of people who, short of being natives in the strict sense, had associations of one sort or another with the city, including among its small Greek minority until the 1923 Population exchange between Greece and Turkey. Among these can be listed:

 Arms trading tycoon Basil Zaharoff, whose family were actually Greeks of the Ottomnan capital but who was born in Muğla in 1849
 The French actress of Greek descent Anna Mouglalis, as attested by her name, can trace her roots to the city
 Mining and poultry magnate Yavuz Sıtkı Koçman (d. 2002) who contributed an important part of his fortune to building the university in the 1990s

See also 
Caria
Menteşe (district)
Menteşe (beylik) (Anatolian beyliks)
Muğla University
Mesut of Menteşe

Footnotes

References

Sources

External links 

 Muğla Municipality
 Several hundreds of pictures

 
Ancient Greek archaeological sites in Turkey
Caria
Cities in Turkey
Districts of Muğla Province
Populated places in Muğla Province